'Poised to Break' is the debut studio album by Sunday's Best, a now-defunct American emo band that originated in California.

Track listing
 "The Hardest Part" – 3:31
 "Bruise Blue" – 3:41
 "White Picket Fences" – 3:35
 "Saccharine" – 3:48
 "Indian Summer" – 3:18
 "When Is Pearl Harbor Day?" – 4:05
 "In Beat Like Trains" – 4:14
 "Looks Like a Mess" – 5:50
 "Winter-Owned" – 2:50
 "Congratulations" – 16:37

References

2000 debut albums
Sunday's Best albums
Polyvinyl Record Co. albums